Rock Ledge can refer to:
 Rock Ledge (Norwalk, Connecticut), listed on NRHP
 Rock Ledge (Rhinebeck, New York), NRHP
 Rock Ledge (Kingsport, Tennessee), NRHP